Siskiyou Summit (also Siskiyou Mtn. Summit; also referred to as Siskiyou Pass) is a summit (high point) on Interstate 5 (I-5) in the U.S. state of Oregon. It is distinct from Siskiyou Pass, which is a nearby, historical mountain pass. At , it is the highest point on Interstate 5.

Geography
The Siskiyou Mountains form the watershed boundary between the Klamath and Rogue Rivers and are also a rough natural separator between Oregon and California. The Pacific Crest National Scenic Trail crosses the highway here on the way to Mexico from Canada.

Climate

The road over Siskiyou Summit is typically closed to traffic for many days during winter due to severe weather conditions. At times, it can be closed during winter even when the weather is fine. Regardless, weather data is important to those involved in transportation over the summit. Average monthly temperatures and rainfall are given in the table below. Snow generally falls during the months of November through April, typically peaking with four such days in December. The average number of rainy days per month varies from 11 in December to only two in June, August and September.

History

The Hudson’s Bay Company carved a route from Oregon to California during their hunt for furs and pelts following Native American trails. HBC developed the Siskiyou Trail in 1827, which included crossing Siskiyou Summit. In the 1830s, Ewing Young, using horses and mules, led hundreds of cattle over the Siskiyou Trail, necessitating its widening; this process, which took three months to complete, linked the Shasta Valley in California with the Rogue Valley in Oregon. Scientists and cartographers of the United States Exploring Expedition carried out studies along this trail in 1841, while miners of the California Gold Rush traversed the trail to reach the gold fields. In the 1860s, the trail was widened so that stagecoaches could easily traverse it. The first telegraph line was added in 1864. Only in the 1960s did it become the modern highway now designated Interstate 5.

Road
The summit "towering 4310 ft straight up and straight down with curves thrown in for variety", has enough space for parking two lanes of rigs on both flanks of the road. Since the gradient is about 6%, it is a preferred place for truckers to park, refuel, check the condition of their vehicles, and rest. The road down from the summit on the north side is steep and winding. During winter, reaching the summit can be a challenge due to snow and ice on the pavement. In 2008, after the Central Oregon and Pacific Railroad rail link between Medford, Oregon and Weed, California was closed, the highway saw greater use by truckers to carry timber and finished products. In order to reduce reliance on this hazardous mountain road and to reduce the expense of highway transport, proposals were made to reopen the rail link. The rail line over the pass was reopened in 2015.

See also
 List of mountain passes in Oregon

References

Mountain passes of Oregon
Interstate 5
Landforms of Jackson County, Oregon
North American 1000 m summits